Sinocolpodes is a genus of ground beetles in the family Carabidae. There are at least three described species in Sinocolpodes, all of which are found in China.

Species
These three species belong to the genus Sinocolpodes:
 Sinocolpodes krapog (Morvan, 1999)
 Sinocolpodes semiaeneus (Fairmaire, 1886)
 Sinocolpodes sycophanta (Fairmaire, 1886)

References

Platyninae